Anthony Kennedy Warder (8 September 1924 – 8 January 2013) was a British Indologist. His best-known works are Introduction to Pali (1963), Indian Buddhism (1970), and the eight-volume Indian Kāvya Literature (1972–2011).

Life
Warder was born in England on 8 September 1924.

He studied Sanskrit and Pali at the School of Oriental and African Studies, and received his doctorate from there in 1954. His thesis, supervised by John Brough, was entitled Pali Metre: A Study of the Evolution of Early Middle Indian Metre Based on the Verse Preserved in the Pali Canon. (When it was published in 1967, the title was changed to Pali Metre: A Contribution to the History of Indian Literature.)

For a number of years, he was an active member of the Pali Text Society, which published his first book, Introduction to Pali, in 1963. He based this popular primer on extracts from the Dīgha Nikāya, and took the then revolutionary step of treating Pali as an independent language, not just a derivative of Sanskrit.

His began his academic career at the University of Edinburgh in 1955, but in 1963 moved to the University of Toronto. There, as Chairman of the Department of East Asian Studies, he built up a strong programme in Sanskrit and South Asian studies. He retired in 1990.

Studies on Buddhism in Honour of Professor A. K. Warder was published in 1993, edited by Narendra K. Wagle and Fumimaro Watanabe.

He and his wife, Nargez, died of natural causes almost simultaneously on 8 January 2013. He was eighty-eight, and she was ninety. They had no children. They were buried together following a Buddhist service.

Notable works
Introduction to Pali (1st ed. 1963, 2nd ed. 1974, 3rd ed. 1991)
Pali Metre: A Contribution to the History of Indian Literature (1967)
Indian Buddhism (1st ed. 1970, 2nd ed. 1980, 3rd ed. 2000)
A Course in Indian Philosophy (1st ed. 1971, 2nd ed. 1998)
An Introduction to Indian Historiography (1972)
Indian Kāvya Literature: Volumes IVIII (19722011)

Notes

References

1924 births
2013 deaths
Academic staff of the University of Toronto
Academics of the University of Edinburgh
Alumni of SOAS University of London
British Indologists
British orientalists
British Sanskrit scholars
British scholars of Buddhism
Linguists of Pali
Pali
Theravada Buddhism writers